In the mathematics of transfinite numbers, an ineffable cardinal is a certain kind of large cardinal number, introduced by . In the following definitions,  will always be a regular uncountable cardinal number. 

An equivalent formulation is that a cardinal  is ineffable if for every sequence  such that each , 

Thus, it is ineffable if and only if it is 2-ineffable.

A totally ineffable cardinal is a cardinal that is -ineffable for every .

Every n-ineffable cardinal is n-almost ineffable (with set of n-almost ineffable below it stationary), and every n-almost ineffable is n-subtle (with set of n-subtle below it stationary).  The least n-subtle cardinal is not even weakly compact (and unlike ineffable cardinals, the least n-almost ineffable is -describable), but n-1-ineffable cardinals are stationary below every n-subtle cardinal.

A cardinal κ is completely ineffable if there is a non-empty  such that
- every  is stationary

Using any finite n > 1 in place of 2 would lead to the same definition, so completely ineffable cardinals are totally ineffable (and have greater consistency strength).

The consistency strength of completely ineffable is below that of 1-iterable cardinals, which in turn is below remarkable cardinals, which in turn is below ω-Erdős cardinals. A list of large cardinal axioms by consistency strength is available  here.

See also
 List of large cardinal properties

References
. 

Large cardinals